ALGLIB is a cross-platform open source numerical analysis and data processing library. It can be used from several programming languages (C++, C#, VB.NET, Python, Delphi).

ALGLIB started in 1999 and has a long history of steady development with roughly 1-3 releases per year. It is used by several open source projects, commercial libraries, and applications (e.g. TOL project, Math.NET Numerics, SpaceClaim).

Features 
Distinctive features of the library are:
 Support for several programming languages with identical APIs (it supports C++, C#, FreePascal/Delphi, VB.NET and Python)
 Self-contained code with no mandatory external dependencies and easy installation
 Portability (it was tested under x86/x86-64/ARM, Windows and Linux)
 Two independent backends (pure C# implementation, native C implementation) with automatically generated APIs (C++, C#, ...)
 Same functionality of commercial and GPL versions, with enhancements for speed and parallelism provided in the commercial version

ALGLIB provides functions for:
 Linear algebra (direct algorithms, solvers, EVD/SVD)
 Fast Fourier transforms
 Numerical integration
 Interpolation
 Linear and nonlinear least-squares fitting
 Optimization (linear and non-linear, both convex and non-convex)
 Ordinary differential equations
 Special functions
 Statistics (descriptive statistics, hypothesis testing)
 Data analysis (classification/regression, including neural networks)
 Multiple precision versions of linear algebra, interpolation and optimization algorithms (using MPFR for floating point computations)

See also 

 List of numerical analysis software
 List of numerical libraries

References

External links 
 Official ALGLIB website

Numerical libraries